The XXXVI Fighter Command is an inactive United States Air Force unit.  Its last assignment was with Sixth Air Force, based at Waller Field, Trinidad, where it was disbanded on 30 April 1943.

History
Engaged in antisubmarine operations.

Lineage
 Constituted as the 36th Fighter Command on 9 August 1942
 Activated on 21 August 1942
 Redesignated XXXVI Fighter Command c. 18 September 1942
 Disbanded on 30 April 1943

Assignments
 Sixth Air Force on 21 August 1942 – 30 April 1943

Stations
 Waller Field, Trinidad, 21 August 1942 – 30 April 1943

Components
 Unknown

References

Notes
 Explanatory notes

 Citations

Bibliography

 

36
Military units and formations disestablished in 1943